Homophylotis artonoides is a species of moth in the family Zygaenidae. It is found in Australia from Queensland (Cape York).

The length of the forewings is about 5 mm for males and females. The upperside of the forewings is dark greyish brown with a green tinge. The underside is yellowish grey proximally, but darker distally, with a pale streak below the costa. The upperside of the hindwings is greyish brown around the margin  and an extended translucent central part with densely scaled dark veins. The costal margin is paler. The underside is similar but more yellowish grey.

References

Moths described in 2005
Procridinae